Phoenix is a city in Jackson County, Oregon, United States. The population was 4,538 at the 2010 census.

History
The area was settled in about 1850 by brothers Hiram and Samuel Colver. Samuel Colver laid out the town in 1854. Early residents included Milton Lindley, who operated a sawmill that provided timbers in 1855 for a blockhouse as well as a flouring mill owned by Sylvester M. Wait. For a time, the settlement was known locally as Gasburg after a talkative employee in the kitchen serving the mill hands. Wait, who was an agent for the Phoenix Insurance Company of Hartford, Connecticut, assigned the official name, Phoenix, to the community and, in 1857, to its post office. Waitsburg, Washington, was later named after Wait.

2020 fire
On September 8, 2020, much of Phoenix, along with neighboring Talent and parts of Medford and Ashland, were destroyed by the Almeda Drive Fire. On September 11, 2020, authorities said they were preparing for a mass fatality incident. On September 11, it was reported that 600 homes and 100 commercial buildings have been destroyed by the Almeda Drive Fire, but on September 18, that number was updated to 2,800. Officials stated that the Almeda Drive Fire was human-caused. On September 11, a man was arrested for arson, for allegedly starting a fire that destroyed multiple homes in Phoenix and merged with the Almeda Drive Fire. A separate criminal investigation into the origin point of the Almeda Drive Fire in Ashland is ongoing.

Geography

The city is south of Medford and north of Talent and Ashland along Interstate 5 and Oregon Route 99. This is toward the southern end of the Rogue River Valley, near the Siskiyou Mountains and the border with California.

Coleman Creek, a tributary of Bear Creek, joins the larger stream at Phoenix. The Bear Creek Greenway, a biking and hiking trail connecting Ashland, Talent, Medford, and Central Point along Bear Creek, also passes through Phoenix.

Climate
This region experiences hot and dry summers, and cool and wet winters. According to the Köppen climate classification system, Phoenix has a hot-summer Mediterranean climate, abbreviated Csa on climate maps.

Demographics

2010 census
As of the census of 2010, there were 4,538 people, 2,001 households, and 1,178 families living in the city. The racial makeup of the city was 84.0% White, 0.9% African American, 1.5% Native American, 1.3% Asian, 0.2% Pacific Islander, 7.9% from other races, and 4.3% from two or more races. Hispanic or Latino of any race were 15.8% of the population.

There were 2,001 households, of which 24.3% had children under the age of 18 living with them, 42.7% were married couples living together, 10.6% had a female householder with no husband present, 5.5% had a male householder with no wife present, and 41.1% were non-families. 33.1% of all households were made up of individuals, and 16.9% had someone living alone who was 65 years of age or older. The average household size was 2.26 and the average family size was 2.87.

The median age in the city was 44 years. 20.7% of residents were under the age of 18; 7.5% were between the ages of 18 and 24; 22.8% were from 25 to 44; 26.9% were from 45 to 64; and 22% were 65 years of age or older. The gender makeup of the city was 46.9% male and 53.1% female.

2000 census

As of the census of 2000, there were 4,060 people, 1,746 households, and 1,117 families living in the city. The population density was 3,249.8 people per square mile (1,254.1/km2). There were 1,850 housing units at an average density of 1,480.8 per square mile (571.4/km2). The racial makeup of the city was 89.95% White, 0.86% African American, 1.08% Native American, 0.67% Asian, 0.17% Pacific Islander, 4.51% from other races, and 2.76% from two or more races. Hispanic or Latino of any race were 8.89% of the population.

There were 1,746 households, out of which 28.5% had children under the age of 18 living with them, 49.6% were married couples living together, 11.1% had a female householder with no husband present, and 36.0% were non-families. 29.3% of all households were made up of individuals, and 14.9% had someone living alone who was 65 years of age or older. The average household size was 2.32 and the average family size was 2.84.

In the city, the population was spread out, with 23.2% under the age of 18, 7.5% from 18 to 24, 24.7% from 25 to 44, 23.5% from 45 to 64, and 21.1% who were 65 years of age or older. The median age was 41 years. For every 100 females, there were 90.1 males. For every 100 females age 18 and over, there were 84.0 males.

The median income for a household in the city was $31,701, and the median income for a family was $38,176. Males had a median income of $29,832 versus $23,719 for females. The per capita income for the city was $16,828. About 8.6% of families and 11.6% of the population were below the poverty line, including 19.3% of those under age 18 and 4.3% of those age 65 or over.

Education

Phoenix is part of the Phoenix-Talent School District. The city is the site of two of the five schools in the district—Phoenix Elementary School and Phoenix High School, as well as Armadillo Technical Institute, a public charter school.

Notable people

 Dennis W. Day, actor and original Mickey Mouse Club (1955–57) cast member.
 Tami Farrell, Miss Oregon Teen USA 2003, Miss Teen USA 2003, Miss California USA 2009
 Bill Pearl, world champion bodybuilder
 Neighb'rhood Childr'n, 1960s psychedelic rock group

In popular culture
An independent film titled Phoenix, Oregon was produced in 2018 and revolves around two characters who live in the city. Despite this, the film was actually shot in Klamath Falls, Oregon. During the COVID-19 pandemic, most US movie theaters were closed. The film was re-released in theaters in smaller cities that remained opened. Because of this, Phoenix, Oregon was the highest grossing film at the US box office for three weeks in March and April 2020. Its biggest weekend was April 10–12, 2020, when it earned more than $11,000 at the box office.

The city features in the 1995 Russian movie American Daughter, in which the main character and his daughter attempt to travel to Phoenix, Arizona, but wind up in Oregon instead.

References

External links
Listing for Phoenix in the Oregon Blue Book

 
Cities in Oregon
Cities in Jackson County, Oregon
Populated places established in 1854
1854 establishments in Oregon Territory